Wálter Guevara Arze (March 11, 1912 in Ayopaya Province, Cochabamba Department, Bolivia – June 20, 1996 in La Paz, Bolivia) was a Bolivian statesman, cabinet minister, writer, and diplomat, who served as the 54th president of Bolivia on an interim basis in 1979.

Background and earlier career

Guevara was born in Ayopaya Province, Cochabamba Department on March 11, 1912. Trained as a lawyer and economist, he studied in the United States. He co-founded the Movimiento Nacionalista Revolucionario (MNR) in 1941, alongside Víctor Paz Estenssoro, Hernán Siles, and others. When the MNR came to power following the 1952 Bolivian Revolution, Guevara served as minister of foreign relations in the cabinet of President Paz Estenssoro (1952–56). He was then appointed Minister of Interior by President Siles (1956–60). Often seen as the third-highest leader in the MNR hierarchy (after Paz and Siles), the relatively conservative Guevara clashed repeatedly on ideological grounds with Juan Lechín and others associated with the Left wing of the party. Fully expecting to be the party's official candidate for president in 1960, he left it abruptly to form his own political organization when Paz Estenssoro decided to return to Bolivia and run for re-election. The party Guevara founded was the Partido Revolucionario Auténtico, in whose representation he ran for president in 1960, finishing second to Paz. In 1964, Guevara supported the military coup d'état that toppled the MNR from power, and once more served as Minister of Foreign Relations, this time to President René Barrientos.

The long years in exile following the establishment of the 1971-78 dictatorship of General Hugo Banzer brought Guevara closer to the main body of the MNR, by now divested of its  more left-leaning elements, including Siles and Lechín. When democratic elections were at long last called again in 1978, Guevara ran as Paz Estenssoro's vice-presidential running mate. Their ticket finished second. When that electoral contest was annulled due to evidence of fraud, a second one was held a year later. Guevara this time did not run on the main formula, but was elected Senator in representation of the MNR alliance. Soon, he was proclaimed President of the Senate by his peers. Since no presidential candidate in the 1979 elections had received the necessary 50% of the vote, it fell to Congress to decide who should be first executive. To the surprise of many, it could not agree on any candidate, no matter how many votes were taken. Positions hardened, and no solution seemed possible, until an alternative was offered in the form of the President of the Senate, Wálter Guevara, who was named temporary Bolivian president in August 1979 pending the calling of new elections in 1980.

President of Bolivia

Guevara's tenure was short and difficult. Faced with a mounting economic and fiscal crisis, the new president declared that it might be advisable to extend his mandate by an extra year in order to allow him to confidently take the adequate measures. This was seen by many as a naked power grab and his popularity plummeted to the point that he had to resort to a purely technocratic cabinet in the absence of any congressional support. This impasse was taken advantage of by some conspiratorial members of the military, who were displeased with the fast pace, the tone, and the results of the democratic restoration.

Deposed in a bloody coup

On November 1, 1979, General Alberto Natusch surprisingly toppled President Guevara in a bloody coup d'état that was resisted by the urban population. Natusch did take possession, but not without considerable bloodshed. Moreover, the citizenry continued to resist, led by a nationwide labor strike called by the powerful Central Obrera Boliviana (COB) of Juan Lechín. In the end, Natusch was able to occupy the Palacio Quemado for only sixteen days, after which he was forced to give up his quixotic struggle. The only face-saving concession he extracted from Congress was the promise that Guevara not be allowed to resume his duties as president. This condition was accepted and a new provisional president was found in the leader of the lower congressional house (the House of Deputies), Mrs. Lidia Gueiler.

Later career

Guevara, although bitter by the strange circumstances that surrounded his ousting, resumed his position as president of the Senate on 19 November and continued to support Paz Estenssoro in subsequent elections (1980, 1985). In 1982 he was appointed Bolivian Ambassador to Venezuela. In 1989 (already quite elderly) he again ran for office, this time as vice-presidential running mate to the MNR's Gonzalo Sánchez de Lozada. Although they received a majority of the votes, Sanchez and Guevara did not accede to the Quemado, as Congress selected as president the third-place finisher, Jaime Paz.

Retirement and death

Guevara then retired from public life and died in La Paz on June 20, 1996.

See also
 Cabinet of Wálter Guevara

Sources

Mesa José de; Gisbert, Teresa; and Carlos D. Mesa, "Historia De Bolivia."

External links 

 Newspaper clippings about Wálter Guevara in the Presencia Newspaper Archives (in Spanish)

 

1912 births
1996 deaths
20th-century Bolivian lawyers
20th-century Bolivian politicians
Ambassadors of Bolivia to France
Ambassadors of Bolivia to Venezuela
Bolivian economists
Bolivian diplomats
Bolivian people of Spanish descent
Bolivian sociologists
Candidates in the 1960 Bolivian presidential election
Candidates in the 1980 Bolivian presidential election
Foreign ministers of Bolivia
Grand Crosses 1st class of the Order of Merit of the Federal Republic of Germany
Government ministers of Bolivia
Higher University of San Andrés alumni
Leaders ousted by a coup
Members of the Chamber of Deputies (Bolivia)
Members of the Senate of Bolivia
Interior ministers of Bolivia
Justice ministers of Bolivia
Permanent Representatives of Bolivia to the United Nations
People from Cochabamba
Presidents of Bolivia
Presidents of the Senate of Bolivia
Revolutionary Nationalist Movement politicians
University of Chicago alumni